Material is the thirty-second album by the jazz fusion group Casiopea, recorded and released in 1999.

Track listing

Personnel 
CASIOPEA are
Issei Noro - Guitars, Synthesizer, Voice
Minoru Mukaiya - Keyboards
Yoshihiro Naruse - Bass, Bass Synthesizer

Support member:
Akira Jimbo - Drums, Hip Gig (2, 7)

Additional Musicians:
Takahiro Kaneko - Tenor Saxophone (1, 2, 11)
Futoshi Kobayashi - Trumpet (1, 2, 11)
Yasushi Horicuchi & CASIOPEA - Manipulation of Synthesizer & Sequencer

Production 
 Sound Produced - CASIOPEA

 Recording & Mixing Engineer - Hiroyuki Shimura
 Assistant Engineer - Masashi Yanagisawa, Tadashi Yamaguchi
 Mastering Engineer - Mitsukazu Tanaka

 Instruments Technician - Yasushi Horiuchi, Eisuke Sasaki, Satoshi Tsuchiya

 Art Direction & Design - Satoshi Yanagisawa
 Photography - Masumi Harada, Satoshi Yanagisawa
 Hair & Make up - Nobuyuki Kohgo

References

External links
 

1999 albums
Casiopea albums
Pony Canyon albums